Benjamin Duffield (November 3, 1753 – December 13, 1799) was an American physician and one of the founding members of the College of Physicians of Philadelphia (1787).

Formative years
Born in Bucks County, Pennsylvania on November 3, 1753, Benjamin Duffield was a son of clockmaker Edward Duffield and Catherine (Parry) Duffield. He studied medicine at the University of Pennsylvania, graduating in 1774. Immediately thereafter, he went to Edinburgh to complete his studies, and brought with him a letter of introduction to a local Lord, penned by his father’s friend, Benjamin Franklin.

Medical career
Upon his return from Scotland, he began working as a surgeon in a military hospital in Reading, Pennsylvania before opening a private practice in Philadelphia. He was elected as a member of the American Philosophical Society in 1786. Duffield’s large practice established himself in the city’s medical field and not long after he became a founding member of the College of Physicians of Philadelphia (1787). He also worked at the Bush Hill yellow fever hospital upon the outbreak of that disease (1793), held lectures on midwifery, and served as a physician to the Walnut street prison.

He died on December 13, 1799, and was buried at the Christ Church Burial Ground in Philadelphia.

References

1753 births
1799 deaths
Members of the American Philosophical Society
Burials at Christ Church, Philadelphia